The Polenlager (Polish Camps) was a system of forced labor camps in Silesia that held Poles during the World War II Nazi German occupation of Poland. The prisoners, originally destined for deportation across the border to the new semi-colonial General Government district, were sent to the Polenlager between 1942 and 1945, once the other locations became too overcrowded to accommodate the prisoners.

There were over 30 Polenlager camps, mostly in Silesia.

History
All Polenlager camps were classified by the Germans as "labour reformatories". They were built near major military work-sites for the steady supply of slave labor. The camps had permanent German staff, augmented by captives and volunteers from other Eastern European countries (known as Hiwis). The Poles were delivered to Polenlagers by trainloads from German temporary transit camps, after they had been evicted from their homes to make way for new settlers (see: Action Saybusch). Some of the Silesians who were imprisoned there, refused to sign the Volksliste (DVL) or claim German nationality.

The Polenlager idea was part of Adolf Hitler's plan, known as Lebensraum, which involved Germanization of all Polish areas annexed by Nazi Germany with the help of settlers from Bukovina, Eastern Galicia and Volhynia. The main purpose of the forcible displacement of Poles was to create a German-only enclave known as Reichsgau Wartheland across the formerly Polish territories.

Camp distribution
There were over 30 Polenlager camps identified in research – mostly in Silesia (26), but also in other locations across the Third Reich and in the present day Czech Republic. Historians estimate their number to have been even higher.

At the Polenlager 75 in Racibórz (Ratibor) – with 142 prisoners as of January 14, 1943 according to records – 22,1% were below the age of 14 years. At the Polenlager 10 in Siemianowice Śląskie (pictured), children as young as eight were forced to work at a stone quarry. The extant documentation indicates that plans for further expansion of the Polenlager camp system had also been made. All of them were designated within the general numbering framework of the Volksdeutsche Mittelstelle camps. They were not numbered successively.

See also
"Polish death camp" controversy

References

Further reading

External links
 Polenlager – lista miejsc pamięci narodowej z lat 1939–1945 

Polish people of World War II
Forced migration
Germany–Poland relations
Nazi war crimes in Poland
Anti-Polish sentiment in Europe